Hotel Gleason/Albemarle Hotel, Imperial Cafe is a historic hotel and commercial building located at Charlottesville, Virginia. It was built in 1896, and has a three-bay, three-story pressed-brick facade raised above the ground-floor recessed loggia in the Late Victorian style.  The loggia is supported on four Corinthian order columns.  The hotel closed in 1976.

It was listed on the National Register of Historic Places in 1983.

References

External links

Hotel buildings on the National Register of Historic Places in Virginia
Victorian architecture in Virginia
Hotel buildings completed in 1896
Buildings and structures in Charlottesville, Virginia
National Register of Historic Places in Charlottesville, Virginia